Eric David Gryba (born April 14, 1988) is a Canadian former professional ice hockey defenceman. Gryba was selected by the Ottawa Senators in the third round, 68th overall, of the 2006 NHL Entry Draft.

Playing career

Ottawa Senators
Gryba was selected in the third round, 68th overall by the Ottawa Senators during the 2006 NHL Entry Draft.  Prior to turning professional, Gryba attended Boston University, where he played four seasons of NCAA Division I ice hockey in the Hockey East conference with the Terriers ice hockey team, winning an NCAA title with the team.  During the 2009–10 NCAA season, he tied the school record for most penalty minutes served.

On March 31, 2010, the Ottawa Senators signed Gryba to a two-year, entry-level contract. On February 16, 2013, he made his NHL debut, playing for Ottawa in Toronto against the Toronto Maple Leafs.

Gryba earned his first career NHL point, an assist, against the New York Islanders on February 19, 2013, and scored his first career NHL goal against the Tampa Bay Lightning on March 23, 2013.

On May 2, 2013, in his first Stanley Cup playoff game against the Montreal Canadiens, Gryba delivered a questionable, open-ice hit to Canadiens' forward Lars Eller as Eller received a pass from Raphael Diaz. The hit caused Eller's face to strike the ice, leaving him bleeding and motionless on the ice and later carried off via stretcher. Though there was some question as to whether or not the hit was illegal, Gryba was subsequently suspended for two games when the NHL deemed that Eller's head had been the principal point of contact.

On June 26, 2014, Gryba signed a two-year contract extension with the Senators, valued at $2.5 million.

Edmonton Oilers
On June 27, 2015, on the second day of the 2015 NHL Entry Draft, Gryba was traded by the Senators to the Edmonton Oilers in exchange for Travis Ewanyk and the 107th pick in the fourth round (Christian Wolanin).

After appearing in 53 games for the club, the Oilers chose not to re-sign Gryba, making him an unrestricted free agent. However, Gryba signed a one-year, two-way contract on October 12, 2016, after attending the team's camp on a professional tryout. On December 31, 2017, Gryba cleared waivers and was assigned to the Oilers' American Hockey League (AHL) affiliate, the Bakersfield Condors.

On June 21, 2018, the Oilers placed Gryba on unconditional waivers for the purpose of a buyout.

New Jersey Devils
On July 1, 2018, the opening day of free agency, Gryba was signed by the New Jersey Devils on a one-year, two-way $700,000 contract.

On September 22, 2019, Gryba announced his retirement on his Twitter, after being released from his professional tryout with the Calgary Flames.

Personal life
Gryba's father Shawn is a retired teacher, and his mother Catherine was an executive for the City of Saskatoon. Gryba attended St. Joseph High School. He became engaged to Cate Eckhardt in August 2015 and the two married in the summer of 2016. Gryba is also an avid hunter and fisherman who co-owns a company called Capital Waterfowling, and has a TV show called Grilling With Gryba.

Career statistics

Awards and honours

References

External links

1988 births
Living people
Bakersfield Condors players
Binghamton Devils players
Binghamton Senators players
Boston University Terriers men's ice hockey players
Canadian ice hockey defencemen
Edmonton Oilers players
Green Bay Gamblers players
Ice hockey people from Saskatchewan
Melfort Mustangs players
New Jersey Devils players
Ottawa Senators draft picks
Ottawa Senators players
Sportspeople from Saskatoon